Satti is a surname that may refer to people from the Satti tribe or other people, which include:

C. John Satti, American politician
Ghulam Murtaza Satti, Pakistani politician
Marina Satti (born 1986), Greek singer, songwriter and music producer
Roberto Satti (born 1945), Italian singer, musician and film actor
Satinder Satti, Indian television host
Satpal Singh Satti, Indian politician
Tauseef Satti (born 1980), New Zealand-based cricketer
Mohamed Hamad Satti, Sudanese physician (1914-2005)